Royal Stade Brainois, often called just Stade Brainois was a Belgian football club from Braine-le-Comte, Hainaut, Wallonia.

History
The club was founded on 1 July 1923 
as Amicale Athlétique Brainoise. Two years later it received the matricule 343, which it kept throughout its history.

On 13 June 1951, the club became a "royal society", and adopted the name  Royale Amicale Athlétique Brainoise accordingly.

On the 1 July 1969, a neighboring club, Union Sportive Branoise, founded 7 April 1938, matricule 2607 was merged into the club and became Stade Branois.

The club never reached higher in the league pyramid than the national fourth tier, where they spent the majority of their history. They suffered relegation 4 times; in 1978-79, 1987-88, 1995-96 and 2001-02.

However they did win the Hainaut Championship 3 times and reached the 5th round of the national cup in 2018.

In April 2021, Stade Brainois and AFC Tubize announced theirintention to merge and the new was to be re-named Royale Union Tubize-Braine. On 1 July 2021 the club was merged into AFC Tubize and ceased to exist along with its matricule.

Notable players
The club is best known as the first club of Eden Hazard, between 1995 and 2003, joining them at the age of 4. During his time at the club, one of his youth coaches described him as a "gifted" player. He added: "He knew everything. I had nothing to teach him".

His brothers Thorgan and Ethan started their careers at the club too.

Honours and achievements
Hainaut First Division
Champions: 1971, 1986, 1993, 1999

Hainaut Second Division 
Champions: 2016

Belgian Cup:
1st Round: 2017–18
2nd Round: 2010-11, 2020–21
5th round: 2018-19

References

Football clubs in Belgium
Defunct football clubs in Belgium
Association football clubs established in 1923
1923 establishments in Belgium
Association football clubs disestablished in 2021
2021 disestablishments in Belgium